The Dents Blanches (from French, lit. White Teeth) is a mountain in the Chablais Alps on the Swiss-French border. It is composed of several summits of which the Dent de Barme is the highest.

References

External links
 Dents Blanches on Summitpost

Mountains of the Alps
Mountains of Valais
Mountains of Haute-Savoie
France–Switzerland border
International mountains of Europe
Mountains of Switzerland
Two-thousanders of Switzerland

ka:დან-ბლანში